Haught is a surname. Notable people with the surname include:

Gary Haught (born 1970), American baseball player
John F. Haught, American Roman Catholic theologian